Flipping Vegas is an American reality television series on A&E in the United States. The series premiered on June 18, 2011, and ran through September 2014. It features Scott Yancey and his wife Amie Yancey with realtors from their brokerage Goliath Company as they buy, fix and flip houses in Las Vegas, Nevada.
Originally airing on Saturday mornings, A&E moved the show to Saturday evenings at the beginning of Season three.  The show was moved back to Saturday afternoons for the final eight episodes. FYI and A&E split up Season 3's 23 episodes to make Seasons 4 and 5 on FYI. A&E lists it as only 3 Seasons.

After the success of Flipping Vegas, similar shows from other cities such as Flipping Boston and Flipping Miami premiered in 2012 and 2013.

Overview
Scott Yancey and his wife, interior designer Amie Yancey, purchase low-priced houses in the Las Vegas Valley through their real estate brokerage, Goliath Company. The houses are then renovated with a low budget and a quick schedule in order to be sold as soon as possible, a process known as flipping.

Many of the houses featured on the series are presented as having been vandalized or unkept by the previous tenants, and thus are in need of clean-up or expensive repairs. Scott desires to spend as little money as possible on each house to achieve a maximum profit. However, Amie is passionate about her design choices and frequently makes expensive purchases on upgrades that are not budgeted, and often does so without informing Scott, which upsets him. Scott usually does not agree with Amie's belief that such upgrades help to sell a house.

In some episodes, Scott has a project manager oversee renovations for him. Because of various types of delays, workers typically struggle to get each house complete in time for an open house event, during which one of Scott's real estate agents gives tours of the property to potential buyers. Throughout each episode, Scott, Amie, and others speak to the viewer through interview clips to provide information and opinions about each other and about the property featured in that episode.

Cast
 Scott Yancey
 Amie Yancey
 Michelle, the manager at Walker Zanger, a business from which Amie regularly chooses tiles and countertops for each house.

Project managers
 Baldemar Rivera (season 1–2)
 Dino (season 1)
 Darryll (season 2 episode 1,episode 6)
 Larry (season 2–5)

Real estate agents
 Heather Stone
 Gady Medrano
 Rexalynn
 Michelle

Production
Regarding the show's origin, Scott Yancey said: "I'm from the Hollywood area originally, and I was talking with some buddies who are in the industry. I was telling them how I had to pull my Glock out on some homeless guys who came at me with needles in one of the houses that was all boarded up. They're like, 'Man, you need your own reality show. We'll make it like a commercial for your website or something.' So I paid their expenses, and they gave it to another friend of ours, who gave it to a guy who worked at Lionsgate."

The series filmed its pilot in 2009, under the working title of Last House Standing. The second season concluded filming in April 2012. As of November 2013, the show was filming its fifth season. Approximately 120 to 140 hours of footage was shot for each episode, which was then edited down to 43 minutes. Scott Yancey said, "The houses that are the worst to buy are the ones we save for TV because we know there's a great storyline with it".

Regarding the biggest misconception that viewers may have about the show, Scott Yancey said, "What the people see is us stressed in a house on an episode. What they don't see is us doing five others at the same time. [...] The TV show usually edits in the drama. They don't see that an hour from now, we're gonna be holding hands walking our dog somewhere. They edit it in a way that's obviously going to be most entertaining. They don't ever show me say 'thank you, good job' to somebody or show us going to a restaurant at night or in the summer on a beach." Amie Yancey said, "The main thing is that in TV land, they speed everything up. They [the viewers] think,  'Oh, wow, it's a breeze. They come in, and it's done.' It takes a long time to put them together, to pick out the fit and finish and work on the quality. They only see a glimpse of it."

Legal issues 
Scott Yancey has been named as one of the defendants in an active Federal Trade Commission and Utah Division of Consumer Protection lawsuit against Nudge, LLC. The complaint alleges that Yancey used the notoriety and celebrity status gained from 
Flipping Vegas to entice consumers into various real-estate flipping courses and potential real estate purchase schemes that fleeced consumers out of $400 million dollars. Yancey is reported to have received at least $10 million from Nudge, LLC beginning the year after Flipping Vegas began airing.

Episodes  
Season 3 was split into Seasons 4 and 5 on FYI.

Season 1 (2010-11)

Season 2 (2012-13)

Season 3 (2013)

Season 4 (2014)

Season 5 (2014)

References

External links 

 

2011 American television series debuts
2010s American reality television series
2014 American television series endings
A&E (TV network) original programming
Television shows set in the Las Vegas Valley